Prunus alleghaniensis, the Allegheny plum, is a species of New World plum, native to the Appalachian Mountains.

Description
The leaf margins are finely toothed. The twigs sometimes have thorns. The bark is fissured in older specimens. The flowers are plentiful and white, eventually turning pink.

Distribution and habitat
The species is native to the Appalachian Mountains from New York to Kentucky and North Carolina, plus the Lower Peninsula of Michigan. There are old reports of it growing also in New Jersey and Connecticut, but it now appears to have been extirpated in those two states.

It is not common in moist woodlands.

Uses
The fruit is made into preserves and jelly.

References

External links

 
 

alleghaniensis
alleghaniensis
Plants described in 1877
Flora of the Eastern United States